Corrie is a unisex surname in the English language. The name has several different etymological origins. The name is found in numbers in the north of Ireland. The surname has been borne by a noted Scottish family, that was originally seated in what is today the civil parish of Hutton and Corrie.

Etymology

In some cases the surname originated as a habitational name, derived from several different locations named Corrie. For example, the surnames are derived from the places so-named on the Isle of Arran, and in Dumfries (both of which are located in Scotland). The place names are derived from the Gaelic coire, meaning "cauldron", which was used in place names to describe a circular valley on the side of a mountain.

Another origin of the surname is from a variation of the surnames Corry and McCorry, which are common in the north of Ireland. These particular surnames are derived from the Irish Mac Gothraidh, meaning "son of Gothradh".

Distribution
In Ireland, the surname is rare, although it is found in numbers in Belfast and Derry. The surname, when found in Ireland, can originate as either the northern Irish patronym, or from any of the Scottish toponyms.

Families
The name has been borne by a notable Scottish family, the Corrie family, that was seated in Dumfries. The family derived its surname from the toponym in Dumfries, which is located in what is now the civil parish of Hutton and Corrie. The leading branch of the family were known as the Corries of that Ilk.

People with the surname

 Daniel Corrie (1777–1837), English Bishop of Madras
 Edward Corrie (1848–1931), English rower
 Christina Jane Corrie (1867–1937), Australian suffragist, founded the Queensland Women's Electoral League
 Joe Corrie, (1894–1968), Scottish miner, poet and playwright
 Will Corrie, British actor of the silent movie era
 John Corrie, (born 1935), Scottish former Conservative MP and MEP
 Eoghan Corry (born 1961), Irish journalist and travel writer
 Heather Corrie (born 1971), British–American canoeist
 George Corrie (footballer) (born 1973), English footballer in the USA
 Emily Corrie (born 1978), British actress
 Rachel Corrie, (1979–2003), American ISM volunteer killed by an Israeli bulldozer in the Gaza Strip
 Anthony Corrie (born 1984), Australian rules footballer
 Miaoux Miaoux (born 1985; real name Julian Victor Corrie), music producer and musician
 Edward Corrie (born 1988), British tennis player

References

English-language surnames
Patronymic surnames
Toponymic surnames